The 1915 Argentine Primera División was the 24th season of top-flight football in Argentina. The season began on April 4 and ended on January 1916. The reunification of the "Asociación Argentina de Football" and the "Federación Argentina de Football" brought the creation of a championship of 25 teams. The tournament took a league format with each team playing the others once.

Clubs that made their debuts in Primera were San Lorenzo de Almagro (Segunda División (AFA) champion) and Defensores de Belgrano (División Intermedia (FAF) champion). The coming of San Lorenzo caused all the "big five" to meet in an official tournament for the first time. Racing achieved its 3° consecutive championship.

For the first time in Primera División history, four teams were relegated: Kimberley, Defensores de Belgrano, Comercio and Floresta.

Standings

Championship playoff 

Racing and San Isidro finished level on points at the top of the table, necessitating a championship playoff, where Racing won their 3rd. consecutive league title.

Match details

References

Argentine Primera División seasons
p
p
1915 in Argentine football
1915 in South American football